Lithospermum arvense (syn. Buglossoides arvensis), known as field gromwell, corn gromwell, bastard alkanet, stone seed and Ahiflower®, is a flowering plant of the family Boraginaceae. It is native to Europe and Asia, as far north as Korea, Japan and Russia, and as far south as Afghanistan and northern Pakistan.[1] It is known in other places as an introduced species, including much of North America and Australia.[2],[3] The European Union has granted the refined oil of the seed of Buglossoides arvensis novel food status and some farmers are growing it[4]commercially in the United Kingdom as a plant-variety patented (PVP) and trademarked cultivar (Ahiflower). The seed oil contains high levels (63-72%) of omega-3 ALA (c18:3), omega-3 SDA (c18:4), and omega-6 GLA (c18:3)[5] and has GRAS (generally regarded as safe) review status from the US Food and Drug Administration, Canadian ingredient master file (IMF) registration and novel food status, and GMP+ Feed Support Product status in the EU for livestock and companion animals (including for defatted expeller press cake meal).

Refined Buglossoides oil has peer-reviewed published human clinical evidence from controlled dietary intervention trials showing up to 400% more efficient omega-3 EPA (c20:5) accrual in circulating cells vs flaxseed oil[6] and has been shown to significantly upregulate the cytokine interleukin-10 (IL-10) in lipopolysaccharide (LPS) stimulated macrophages by +40% vs. control[7]. IL-10 is recognized as one of the immune modulatory signaling cytokines that moderates the inflammatory response after intensive exercise or immune challenge.

Seeds of Buglossoides have been reported in Ukrainian archeological sites dating back as far as 4000 BC where they were stored in clay pots, however the purpose and usage of the seeds has not been determined. In modern European arable agriculture, Buglossoides often appears as a weed species with poor competitive and non-invasive characteristics.

References
[1]  "Lithospermum arvense Linnaeus, Sp. Pl. 1: 132. 1753". Flora of China. 

[2]   ^ USDA Plants Profile

[3]   ^ "Buglossoides arvensis". Australian Plant Name Index (APNI), IBIS database. Centre for Plant Biodiversity Research, Australian Government, Canberra. Retrieved 20 March 2012.

[4] ^ Nosowitz, Dan (19 November 2015). "What Is This Weird Weed, and Why Are Farmers and Health Nuts So Into It?". Modern Farmer. Retrieved 30 November 2015.

[5] Cumberford G & Hebard A (2015) Ahiflower oil: A novel non-GM plant-based omega-3+6 source. J Lipid Tech Sep 28:9; 207-210. Retrieved 10 Jun 2022.

[6] Lefort (2016) Consumption of Buglossoides arvensis seed oil is safe and increases tissue long-chain n-3 fatty acid content more than flax seed oil. J Nutr Sci 5:e2, 1-12. Retrieved 10 Jun 2022.

[7] Lefort (2017) Dietary Buglossoides arvensis oil increases circulating n-3 polyunsaturated fatty acids in a dose-dependent manner and enhances lipopolysaccharide-stimulated whole blood interleukin-10—a randomized placebo-controlled trial. Nutrients 9:261; 1-17. Retrieved 10 Jun 2022.

External links 

Jepson Manual Treatment

arvense
Flora of Pakistan
Plants described in 1753
Taxa named by Carl Linnaeus
Flora of Malta